Germany competed at the 2019 Winter Deaflympics held between 12 and 21 December 2019 in Province of Sondrio in Northern Italy. The country won one silver medal and the country finished in 13th place in the medal table.

Medalists

Chess 

The men's team won the silver medal in the men's tournament.

References 

Winter Deaflympics
Nations at the 2019 Winter Deaflympics